PTGui is a panorama photo stitching program for Windows and macOS developed by New House Internet Services BV. PTGui was created as a GUI frontend to Helmut Dersch's Panorama Tools. It features its own stitching and blending engine along with compatibility to Panorama Tools. PTGui supports telephoto, normal, wide angle and fisheye lenses to create partial cylindrical up to full spherical panoramas. PTGui can handle multiple rows of images.

Originally released for Windows, version 6.0.3 introduced support for Mac OS X.

The 'free trial version' of PTGui is fully functional but creates panoramas with embedded visible watermarks.

PTGui Pro also includes HDR and tone mapping support.

See also
Hugin is an open source alternative also based on Panorama Tools

Further reading
Jacobs, Corinna - Interactive Panoramas: Techniques for Digital Panoramic Photography 
Andrews, Philip - 360 Degree Imaging: The Photographers Panoramic Virtual Reality Manual

References

External links

C (programming language) software
C++ software
Panorama software
Windows graphics-related software
MacOS graphics software
Photo stitching software
Photo software
Software that uses wxWidgets
HDR tone mapping software